Cabestana felipponei is a species of predatory sea snail, a marine gastropod mollusk in the family Cymatiidae.

Distribution

Description 
The maximum recorded shell length is 53 mm.

Habitat 
Minimum recorded depth is 30 m. Maximum recorded depth is 140 m.

References

Cymatiidae
Taxa named by Hermann von Ihering
Gastropods described in 1907